This local electoral calendar for 2020 lists the subnational elections held in 2020. Referendums, recall and retention elections, and national by-elections (special elections) are also included.

January
5 January: Uzbekistan, Regional Councils, District Councils and City Councils (2nd round)
13 January: Bangladesh, Chittagong-8, House of the Nation by-election
17–18 January: India, Rajasthan, Village Councils (1st phase)
18 January: Malaysia, Kimanis, House of Representatives by-election
22 January: India, Telangana, Municipal Corporations and Municipal Councils
22–23 January: India, Rajasthan, Village Councils (2nd phase)
25 January: Nigeria, Agwara/Borgu and Abi/Yakurr constituencies, House of Representatives by-elections
26 January: 
Austria
Burgenland, Parliament
Lower Austria, 
Italy
Calabria, Regional Council
Emilia-Romagna, Regional Council
28 January: India, Chhattisgarh, District Councils, Township Councils and Village Councils (1st phase)
29–30 January: India, Rajasthan, Village Councils (3rd phase)
30 January: Malawi, Lilongwe South, National Assembly by-election
31 January: India, Chhattisgarh, District Councils, Township Councils and Village Councils (2nd phase)

February
1 February: Bangladesh
Dhaka North, Mayor and City Corporation
Dhaka South, Mayor and City Corporation
2 February: 
Costa Rica, Cantonal Mayors, Cantonal Councils, District Heads, District Councils, Municipal-District Mayors and Municipal-District Councils
Germany, Leipzig, Lord Mayor (1st round)
Japan, Kyoto, 
3 February: India, Chhattisgarh, District Councils, Township Councils and Village Councils (3rd phase)
7–8 February: Egypt, Giza 1st district and Minya Mallawi district, House of Representatives by-elections (voting abroad)
8 February: India, Delhi, Legislative Assembly
9 February: 
Cameroon, 
India, Karnataka, Municipal Councils and Town Councils
Switzerland
Aargau, 
Basel-Stadt, referendums
Bern, 
Fribourg, referendum
Geneva, referendums
Grisons, referendum
Neuchâtel, referendum
Schaffhausen, referendum
Solothurn, referendum
St. Gallen, referendum
Ticino, referendums
Zürich, 
11–12 February: Egypt, Giza 1st district and Minya Mallawi district, House of Representatives by-elections
13 February: Zambia, Chilubi, National Assembly by-election
16 February: Hungary, Fejér 4, National Assembly by-election
18 February: United States, Milwaukee, Mayor and Common Council (1st round)
23 February: 
Comoros, Communal Councils
Germany, Hamburg, Parliament
Italy, Naples, Senate by-election
Thailand, Kamphaeng Phet constituency 2, 
29 February: Nigeria, Enugu, Local Government Councils and Chairmen

March
1 March: 
Germany, Leipzig, Lord Mayor (2nd round)
Italy, Rome, Chamber of Deputies by-election
Tajikistan, Regional Legislatures, City Legislatures and District Legislatures
2 March: 
Guyana, Regional Democratic Councils
Jamaica, Clarendon South Eastern, House of Representatives by-election
3 March: United States
California's 25th congressional district, U.S. House of Representatives special election (1st round)
Alabama, Appointed Education Board constitutional referendum
Arkansas, Supreme Court and Court of Appeals (1st round)
Bakersfield, Mayor
Fresno, Mayor and City Council (1st round)
Long Beach, City Council (1st round)
Los Angeles County, Board of Supervisors (1st round)
Los Angeles, City Council (1st round)
Maine, Vaccination Exemptions Repeal referendum
Orange County, CA, Board of Supervisors (1st round)
Riverside County, Board of Supervisors
Sacramento, Mayor and City Council (1st round)
San Bernardino County, Board of Supervisors (1st round)
San Diego County, Board of Supervisors (1st round)
Santa Clara County, Board of Supervisors (1st round)
San Jose, City Council (1st round)
8 March: 
Italy, Terni, Senate by-election
Switzerland
St. Gallen, Government (1st round) and Cantonal Council
Uri, Executive Council and Landrat
14 March: Nigeria, Magama/Rijau constituency, House of Representatives by-election (nullified)
15 March: 
Dominican Republic, Mayors and District Councils
France
Municipal Councils (1st round)
Lyon Metropolis, 
Marseille, 
Paris, Council (1st round)
French Polynesia, 
New Caledonia, 
Saint Pierre and Miquelon, 
Germany, Bavaria, 
Munich, 
Nuremberg, 
Switzerland
Appenzell Ausserrhoden, Municipal Councils (1st round)
Geneva, Municipal Councils (1st round)
Thurgau, Executive Council and Grand Council
21 March: Bangladesh, Bagerhat-4, Dhaka-10 and Gaibandha-3, House of the Nation by-elections
22 March: 
Japan, Kumamoto, Governor
Switzerland, Schwyz, Executive Council (1st round) and Cantonal Council
28 March: Australia, Queensland, Mayors, Regional Councils, City Councils, Aboriginal Shire Councils and Shire Councils
Brisbane, Lord Mayor and City Council
29 March: Germany, Bavaria, 
Munich, 
Nuremberg,

April
4–18 April: Papua New Guinea, Menyamya, National Parliament by-election
5 April: Switzerland, Geneva, Municipal Councils (2nd round)
7 April: United States
Anchorage, Assembly
Wisconsin, Supreme Court and Court of Appeals
Milwaukee, Mayor and Common Council (2nd round)
12 April: Kyrgyzstan, City Councils and Village Councils
19 April: Switzerland, St. Gallen, Government (2nd round)
26 April: 
Japan, 
Switzerland, Appenzell Ausserrhoden, Municipal Councils (2nd round)
28 April: United States, Maryland's 7th congressional district, U.S. House of Representatives

May
12 May: United States
California's 25th congressional district, U.S. House of Representatives special election (2nd round)
Wisconsin's 7th congressional district, U.S. House of Representatives special election
17 May: 
Benin, Communal Councils, Municipal Councils and District/Village Councils
Switzerland, Schwyz, Executive Council (2nd round)
19 May: United States, Portland, Mayor and City Commission (1st round)
20 May: Burundi, 
25 May: Suriname, District Councils and Local Councils
30 May: Nigeria
Benue, Local Government Councils and Chairmen
Cross River, Local Government Councils and Chairmen

June
2 June: United States, Idaho, Supreme Court and Court of Appeals
5–6 June: Czech Republic, Teplice, Senate by-election (1st round)
6 June: Taiwan, Kaohsiung, Mayor recall election
7 June: Japan, Okinawa, 
9 June: United States
Georgia, Supreme Court and Court of Appeals
West Virginia, Supreme Court of Appeals
12–13 June: Czech Republic, Teplice, Senate by-election (2nd round)
20 June: Thailand, Lampang constituency 4, 
21 June: Serbia
Municipal Assemblies
Vojvodina, Assembly
23 June: United States, New York's 27th congressional district, U.S. House of Representatives special election
28 June: 
Austria, Styria, 
France
Municipal Councils (2nd round)
Lyon Metropolis, 
Marseille, 
Paris, Council (2nd round)
French Polynesia, 
New Caledonia, 
30 June: 
Nigeria, Taraba, Local Government Councils and Chairmen
United States, Oklahoma, Medicaid Expansion constitutional referendum

July
4 July: Australia, Eden-Monaro, House of Representatives by-election
5 July: Japan, Tokyo, Governor
12 July: 
Japan, Kagoshima, 
Spain
Basque Country, Parliament
Galicia, Parliament
14 July: Bangladesh, Bogra-1 and Jessore-6, House of the Nation by-elections
20 July: Nigeria, Ondo, Local Government Councils and Chairmen

August
1 August: Australia, Tasmania, (Huon and Rosevears) Legislative Council
4 August: United States
Mesa, Mayor and City Council
Missouri, Medicaid Expansion constitutional referendum
6 August: United States, Tennessee, Court of Appeals retention election
8 August: United States, Honolulu, Mayor and City Council (1st round)
9 August: Thailand, Samut Prakan constituency 5, 
12 August – 1 September: Autonomous Region of Bougainville, President and House of Representatives
15 August: Taiwan, Kaohsiung, Mayor by-election
18 August: 
Libya, Ghat, Municipal Council
United States, Miami-Dade County, Mayor and County Commission (1st round)
22 August: Australia, Northern Territory, Legislative Assembly
23 August: Switzerland, Appenzell Innerrhoden, extraordinary ballot (1st round)
24 August: Burundi, 
25 August: United States, Tulsa, Mayor and City Council (1st round)
26–29 August: Latvia, Riga, City Council
27 August: 
India, Mizoram, Village Councils and Local Councils
Isle of Man, Douglas South (2 seats), House of Keys by-elections
28 August: Samoa, Gagaʻifomauga No. 3, Legislative Assembly by-election
29 August: Nigeria, Ebonyi, Local Government Councils and Chairmen
30 August: 
Montenegro, Municipal Assemblies
Switzerland, Schaffhausen, Executive Council and referendums

September
3 September: Libya, Misrata, Municipal Council
9 September: Ethiopia, Tigray, State Council, City Councils, District Councils and Neighborhood Councils
11–13 September: Russia, 
Arkhangelsk Oblast, 
Belgorod Oblast, Duma
Bryansk Oblast, 
Chelyabinsk Oblast, 
Chuvashia, 
Irkutsk Oblast, 
Jewish Autonomous Oblast, 
Kaluga Oblast,  and 
Kamchatka Krai, 
Komi Republic,  and 
Kostroma Oblast,  and Duma
Krasnodar Krai, 
Kurgan Oblast, Duma
Kursk Oblast, District 110, State Duma by-election
Leningrad Oblast, 
Magadan Oblast, 
Novosibirsk Oblast, Legislative Assembly
Novosibirsk, 
Penza Oblast, District 147, State Duma by-election and 
Perm Krai, 
Rostov Oblast, 
Ryazan Oblast, Duma
Sevastopol, 
Smolensk Oblast, 
Tambov Oblast, 
Tatarstan, District 28, State Duma by-election and 
Voronezh Oblast, Duma
Yamalo-Nenets Autonomous Okrug, 
Yaroslavl Oblast, District 194, State Duma by-election
13 September: 
Austria, Vorarlberg, 
Germany, North Rhine-Westphalia, District Administrators, District Councils, Mayors and Municipal Councils (1st round)
Cologne, 
Düsseldorf, 
Ruhr, 
Dortmund, 
Duisburg, 
Essen, 
14 September: Canada, New Brunswick, Legislative Assembly
17 September: Zambia, Lukashya and Mwansabombwe, National Assembly by-elections
19 September: Nigeria, Edo, Governor
20 September: France
Haut-Rhin's 1st constituency, 
Maine-et-Loire's 3rd constituency, 
Réunion's 2nd constituency, 
Seine-Maritime's 5th constituency, 
Val-de-Marne's 9th constituency, 
Yvelines's 11th constituency, 
20–21 September: Italy
Sassari, Senate by-election
Villafranca di Verona, Senate by-election
Aosta Valley, Regional Council
Apulia, Regional Council
Campania, Regional Council
Liguria, Regional Council
Marche, Regional Council
Tuscany, Regional Council
Veneto, Regional Council

22 September: Papua New Guinea, Goroka, National Parliament by-election
26 September: 
Bangladesh, Pabna-4, House of the Nation by-election
Malaysia, Sabah, Legislative Assembly
27 September: 
Austria, Vorarlberg, 
France
Haut-Rhin's 1st constituency, 
Maine-et-Loire's 3rd constituency, 
Réunion's 2nd constituency, 
Seine-Maritime's 5th constituency, 
Val-de-Marne's 9th constituency, 
Yvelines's 11th constituency, 
Germany, North Rhine-Westphalia, District Administrators and Mayors (2nd round)
Cologne, 
Dortmund, 
Düsseldorf, 
Romania, County Presidents, County Councils, Mayors, Local Councils, Sector Mayors and Sector Councils
Switzerland
Aargau, referendums
Appenzell Ausserrhoden, referendums
Appenzell Innerrhoden, extraordinary ballot (2nd round)
Basel-Landschaft, referendum
Geneva, referendums
Lucerne, referendum
Nidwalden, referendum
Schaffhausen, Cantonal Council
Schwyz, referendum
Solothurn, referendums
Thurgau, referendum
Uri, referendums
Zürich, 
Uruguay, Departmental Mayors, Departmental Councils, Municipal Mayors and Municipal Councils
28–29 September: India, Rajasthan, Village Councils (4th phase)
29 September: United States, Georgia's 5th congressional district, U.S. House of Representatives special election (1st round)

October
2–3 October: Czech Republic, Regional Assemblies
3–4 October: India, Rajasthan, Village Councils (5th phase)
4–5 October: Italy, 
Sicily, 
6 October: Canada, Nunatsiavut, President
6–7 October: India, Rajasthan, Village Councils (6th phase)
10 October: Nigeria, Ondo, Governor
10–11 October: India, Rajasthan, Village Councils (7th phase)
11 October: 
Austria, Vienna, Parliament
Hungary, Borsod-Abaúj-Zemplén 6, 
15 October: 
Libya, Municipal Councils
Mongolia, Provincial Assemblies, District Assemblies and Subdistrict Assemblies
Ulaanbaatar, City Council
16 October: India, Ladakh, Leh District, Ladakh Autonomous Hill Development Council
17 October: 
Australia, Australian Capital Territory, Legislative Assembly
Bangladesh, Dhaka-5 and Naogaon-6, House of the Nation by-elections
Canada, Nova Scotia, Mayors, Cape Breton Regional Council and Municipal Councils
Halifax, Mayor, Regional Council and School Boards
Nigeria, Bauchi, Local Government Councils and Chairmen
18 October: 
Mexico, 
Coahuila, 
Hidalgo, 
Switzerland
Aargau, 
Jura, Government (1st round) and Parliament
18–19 October: Italy, Sicily, 
21 October: Netherlands, Sint Eustatius, Island Council
24 October: 
Australia, Victoria, Mayors, City Councils, Shire Councils and Borough Council
City of Melbourne, Lord Mayor and City Council
Canada, British Columbia, Legislative Assembly
25 October: 
Cape Verde, Municipal Chambers and Municipal Assemblies
Japan
Okayama, 
Toyama, 
Portugal, Azores, Legislative Assembly
Switzerland, Basel-Stadt, Executive Council (1st round) and Grand Council
Tanzania, Zanzibar, President, House of Representatives, District Councils, Town Councils and Municipal Council
Ukraine, City Mayors, Town Mayors, Village Mayors, Oblast Councils, Raion Councils, City Councils, Urban-District Councils, Town Councils and Village Councils (1st round)
25–26 October: Italy, Sardinia, 
26 October: Canada
Toronto Centre, House of Commons by-election
York Centre, House of Commons by-election
Saskatchewan, Legislative Assembly
28 October: India, Bihar, Legislative Assembly (1st phase)
29 October: India, Rajasthan, Jaipur, Jodhpur and Kota, Municipal Corporations (1st phase)
31 October: 
Australia, Queensland, Legislative Assembly
Georgia, Adjara, Supreme Council
Nigeria
Bayelsa Central, Cross River North, Imo North and Lagos East, Senate by-elections
Akwa Ibom, Local Government Councils and Chairmen

November
1 November: 
India, Rajasthan, Jaipur, Jodhpur and Kota, Municipal Corporations (2nd phase)
Japan, Osaka City, Metropolis Plan referendum
3 November: 
Guam, Mayors and Vice Mayors
India, Bihar, Legislative Assembly (2nd phase)
Northern Mariana Islands, Municipal Councils and Boards of Education
Puerto Rico, Mayors and Municipal Legislatures
San Juan, Mayor
United States, Quadrennial elections
Arizona, U.S. Senate special election
Georgia, U.S. Senate special election (1st round)
Washington, D.C., Council
Alabama
Board of Education and Public Service Commission
Supreme Court, Court of Civil Appeals and Court of Criminal Appeals
Only Citizens Can Vote constitutional referendum
Alaska
House of Representatives and Senate
Supreme Court and Court of Appeals retention elections
Open Primary System and Ranked-Choice Voting referendum
Arizona
Corporation Commission
House of Representatives and Senate
Supreme Court and Court of Appeals retention elections
Legalize Cannabis referendum
Maricopa County, Board of Supervisors
Phoenix, Mayor and City Council (1st round)
Arkansas
House of Representatives and Senate
Supreme Court and Court of Appeals (2nd round)
Initiative Process and Legislative Referral Requirements, and Legislative Term Limits 
California
Assembly and Senate
Affirmative Action, Exempt App-Based Drivers from Employee Benefits, Felony Parolee Voting Rights, Limited Voting Rights for 17-Year-Olds, Rent Control and Replace Cash Bail with Risk Assessments referendums
Bakersfield, City Council
Fresno, City Council (2nd round)
Long Beach, City Council (2nd round)
Los Angeles County, Board of Supervisors (2nd round)
Los Angeles, City Council (2nd round)
Oakland, City Council
Orange County, Board of Supervisors (2nd round)
Sacramento, City Council (2nd round)
San Bernardino County, Board of Supervisors (2nd round)
San Diego County, Board of Supervisors (2nd round)
San Diego, Mayor, City Attorney and City Council
San Francisco, Board of Supervisors
Santa Clara County, Board of Supervisors (2nd round)
San Jose, City Council (2nd round)
Colorado
Board of Education
House of Representatives and Senate
Supreme Court and Court of Appeals retention elections
Only Citizens Can Vote constitutional referendum, and Abortion Ban, National Popular Vote and Paid Medical and Family Leave referendums
Connecticut
House of Representatives and Senate
Delaware
Governor, Lieutenant Governor and Insurance Commissioner
House of Representatives and Senate
Florida
House of Representatives and Senate
Supreme Court and District Courts of Appeal retention elections
Amendments Must Pass Twice, Minimum Wage, Only Citizens Can Vote and Top-Two Open Primaries constitutional referendums
Broward County, Commission
Miami-Dade County, Mayor and County Commission (2nd round)
Georgia
Public Service Commission (1st round)
House of Representatives and Senate
Hawaii
Office of Hawaiian Affairs Board of Trustees
House of Representatives and Senate
Honolulu, Mayor and City Council (2nd round)
Idaho
House of Representatives and Senate
Illinois
House of Representatives and Senate
Supreme Court and Appellate Court retention elections, and Supreme Court and Appellate Court
Graduated Income Tax constitutional referendum
Cook County, Board of Review, Clerk of the Circuit Court, State's Attorney and Water Reclamation District Board
Indiana
Governor and Attorney General
House of Representatives and Senate
Supreme Court and Court of Appeals retention elections
Iowa
House of Representatives and Senate
Supreme Court and Court of Appeals retention elections
Constitutional Convention referendum
Kansas
Board of Education
House of Representatives and Senate
Supreme Court and Court of Appeals retention elections
Kentucky
House of Representatives and Senate
Supreme Court
Louisville, Metropolitan Council
Louisiana
Public Service Commission (1st round)
Supreme Court and Circuit Courts of Appeal (1st round)
Abortion constitutional referendum
Maine
House of Representatives and Senate
Maryland
Court of Appeals and Court of Special Appeals retention elections
Baltimore, Mayor and City Council
Massachusetts
Governor's Council
House of Representatives and Senate
Ranked-Choice Voting referendum
Michigan
Board of Education
House of Representatives
Supreme Court and Court of Appeals
Search Warrant for Electronic Data constitutional referendum
Wayne County, Commission
Minnesota
House of Representatives and Senate
Supreme Court and Court of Appeals
Mississippi
Supreme Court
Elimination of State Electoral College and Medical Cannabis constitutional referendums, and State Flag referendum
Missouri
Governor, Lieutenant Governor, Attorney General, Secretary of State and Treasurer
House of Representatives and Senate
Supreme Court and Court of Appeals retention elections
Executive Term Limits and Redistricting and Lobbying constitutional referendums
Montana
Governor, Attorney General, Auditor, Public Service Commission, Secretary of State and Superintendent of Public Instruction
House of Representatives and Senate
Supreme Court
Legalize Cannabis and Remove Local Authority to Regulate Firearms referendums
Nebraska
Board of Education and Public Service Commission
Legislature
Supreme Court and Court of Appeals retention elections
Nevada
Assembly and Senate
Supreme Court and Court of Appeals
Marriage Regardless of Gender, Renewable Energy Standards, State Board of Pardons Commissioners, Status of Board of Regents and Voting Rights constitutional referendums
Clark County, Commission
New Hampshire
Governor and Executive Council
House of Representatives and Senate
New Jersey
Delayed Redistricting and Legalize Cannabis constitutional referendums
New Mexico
Public Education Commission and Public Regulation Commission
House of Representatives and Senate
Supreme Court retention election, and Supreme Court and Court of Appeals
Appointed Public Regulation Commission constitutional referendum
New York
Assembly and Senate
North Carolina
Governor, Lieutenant Governor, Agriculture Commissioner, Attorney General, Auditor, Insurance Commissioner, Labor Commissioner, Secretary of State, Superintendent of Public Instruction and Treasurer
House of Representatives and Senate
Supreme Court and Court of Appeals
North Dakota
Governor, Auditor, Insurance Commissioner, Public Service Commission, Superintendent of Public Instruction and Treasurer
House of Representatives and Senate
Supreme Court
Double Election or Legislative Approval constitutional referendum
Ohio
Board of Education
House of Representatives and Senate
Supreme Court and Court of Appeals
Oklahoma
Corporation Commission
House of Representatives and Senate
Supreme Court, Court of Civil Appeals and Court of Criminal Appeals retention elections
Criminal History in Sentencing constitutional referendum
Tulsa, City Council (2nd round)
Oregon
Attorney General, Secretary of State and Treasurer
House of Representatives and Senate
Supreme Court and Court of Appeals
Campaign Finance Limits constitutional referendum, and Drug Decriminalization and Legalize Psilocybin referendums
Portland, Mayor and City Commission (2nd round)
Pennsylvania
Attorney General, Auditor and Treasurer
House of Representatives and Senate
Rhode Island
House of Representatives and Senate
Change State Name constitutional referendum
South Carolina
House of Representatives and Senate
South Dakota 
Public Utilities Commission
House of Representatives and Senate
Supreme Court retention election
Legalize Cannabis constitutional referendum and Medical Cannabis referendum
Tennessee
House of Representatives and Senate
Texas
Board of Education and Railroad Commissioner
House of Representatives and Senate
Supreme Court, Court of Criminal Appeals and Courts of Appeals
Arlington, City Council
Austin, City Council (1st round)
Bexar County, Commissioners Court
Dallas County, Commissioners Court
El Paso, Mayor and City Council (1st round)
Harris County, Commissioners Court
Tarrant County, Commissioners Court
Utah
Governor, Attorney General, Auditor, Board of Education and Treasurer
House of Representatives and Senate
Supreme Court and Court of Appeals retention elections
Gender-Neutral Constitutional Language and Remove Slavery as Punishment constitutional referendums
Vermont
Governor, Lieutenant Governor, Attorney General, Auditor, Secretary of State and Treasurer
House of Representatives and Senate
Virginia
Redistricting Commission constitutional referendum
Virginia Beach, Mayor and City Council
Washington
Governor, Lieutenant Governor, Attorney General, Auditor, Insurance Commissioner, Public Lands Commissioner, Secretary of State, Superintendent of Public Instruction and Treasurer
House of Representatives and Senate
Supreme Court and Court of Appeals
West Virginia
Governor, Agriculture Commissioner, Attorney General, Auditor, Secretary of State and Treasurer
House of Delegates and Senate
Wisconsin
Assembly and Senate
Wyoming
House of Representatives and Senate
Supreme Court retention elections
7 November: 
The Gambia, Niamina West, National Assembly by-election
India
Valmiki Nagar, House of the People by-election
Bihar, Legislative Assembly (3rd phase)
8 November: 
Germany, Stuttgart, Lord Mayor (1st round)
Myanmar, State and Regional Hluttaws and Ethnic Affairs Ministers
Switzerland, Jura, Government (2nd round)
8–9 November: Italy, Sardinia, 
9 November: Canada, Saskatchewan, Mayors and Municipal Councils
10 November: India, Rajasthan, Jaipur, Jodhpur and Kota, Mayors
11 November: Barbados, St. George North, House of Representatives by-election
12 November: Bangladesh, Dhaka-18 and Sirajganj-1, House of the Nation by-elections
14 November: Guernsey, Alderney, President
15 November: 
Bosnia and Herzegovina
Brčko District, Assembly
Federation of Bosnia and Herzegovina, Mayors and Municipal Councils
Republika Srpska, Mayors and Municipal Assemblies
Brazil
Mato Grosso, Federal Senate by-election
Mayors and Municipal Councils (1st round)
Rio de Janeiro, Mayor (1st round)
São Paulo, Mayor (1st round)
Japan, Tochigi, 
Pakistan, Gilgit-Baltistan, Legislative Assembly
Ukraine, City Mayors, Town Mayors, Village Mayors, Oblast Councils, Raion Councils, City Councils, Urban-District Councils, Town Councils and Village Councils (2nd round)
19 November: Bhutan, Bumthang, Chhoekhor Tang, National Assembly by-election
22 November: 
Mauritius, Village Councils
Ukraine, City Mayors (2nd round)
23 November: India, Rajasthan, District Councils and Township Councils (1st phase)
25 November: Namibia, 
27 November: India, Rajasthan, District Councils and Township Councils (2nd phase)
28 November: 
Australia, Groom, House of Representatives by-election
Guernsey, Alderney, Parliament
India, Jammu and Kashmir, Municipal Corporation, Municipal Councils, Block Development Councils and Village Councils by-elections and District Development Councils (1st phase)
Nigeria, Borno, Local Government Councils and Chairmen
29 November: 
Brazil, Mayors and Municipal Councils (2nd round)
Rio de Janeiro, Mayor (2nd round)
São Paulo, Mayor (2nd round)
Germany, Stuttgart, Lord Mayor (2nd round)
Switzerland
Aargau, referendum
Basel-Landschaft, referendum
Basel-Stadt, Executive Council (2nd round) and referendums
Fribourg, referendum
Geneva, referendums
Lucerne, referendum
Schwyz, referendum
St. Gallen, referendums
Uri, referendum
Transnistria, District Chairs, District Councils, Mayors and Municipal Councils
Ukraine, Chernivtsi, Mayor (2nd round)

December
1 December: 
India
Jammu and Kashmir, Municipal Corporation, Municipal Councils, Block Development Councils and Village Councils by-elections and District Development Councils (2nd phase)
Rajasthan, District Councils and Township Councils (3rd phase)
Telangana, Hyderabad Metropolitan Region, Greater Hyderabad Municipal Corporation
United States, Georgia's 5th congressional district, U.S. House of Representatives special election (2nd round)
4 December: India
Jammu and Kashmir, Municipal Corporation, Municipal Councils, Block Development Councils and Village Councils by-elections and District Development Councils (3rd phase)
Mizoram, Lai Autonomous District, Council
5 December: 
India, Rajasthan, District Councils and Township Councils (4th phase)
Malaysia, Batu Sapi, House of Representatives by-election
United States, Louisiana
Louisiana's 5th congressional district, U.S. House of Representatives (2nd round)
Public Service Commission and Circuit Courts of Appeal (2nd round)
6 December: Ukraine, Kryvyi Rih, Mayor (2nd round)
7 December: India
Assam, Bodoland, Territorial Council (1st phase)
Jammu and Kashmir, Municipal Corporation, Municipal Councils, Block Development Councils and Village Councils by-elections and District Development Councils (4th phase)
8 December: India, Kerala, Municipal Corporations, Municipal Councils, District Councils, Township Councils and Village Councils (1st phase)
9 December: Indonesia, Governors, Regents and Mayors
10 December: India
Assam, Bodoland, Territorial Council (2nd phase)
Jammu and Kashmir, Municipal Corporation, Municipal Councils, Block Development Councils and Village Councils by-elections and District Development Councils (5th phase)
Kerala, Municipal Corporations, Municipal Councils, District Councils, Township Councils and Village Councils (2nd phase)
12 December: 
India, Goa, District Councils
Nigeria, Kogi, Local Government Councils and Chairmen
United States
El Paso, Mayor and City Council (2nd round)
Houston, City Council (2nd round)
13 December: 
India
Jammu and Kashmir, Municipal Corporation, Municipal Councils, Block Development Councils and Village Councils by-elections and District Development Councils (6th phase)
Rajasthan, Municipal Councils and Town Councils
Niger,  and Municipal Councils
14 December: India, Kerala, Municipal Corporations, Municipal Councils, District Councils, Township Councils and Village Councils (3rd phase)
15 December: 
Kenya, Msambweni, National Assembly by-election
United States, Austin, City Council (2nd round)
16 December: 
Guernsey, Sark, Parliament
India, Jammu and Kashmir, Municipal Corporation, Municipal Councils, Block Development Councils and Village Councils by-elections and District Development Councils (7th phase)
17 December: India, Assam, Kamrup District, Morigaon District and Nagaon District, Tiwa Autonomous Council
18 December: Nigeria, Abia, Local Government Councils and Chairmen
19 December: 
India, Jammu and Kashmir, Municipal Corporation, Municipal Councils, Block Development Councils and Village Councils by-elections and District Development Councils (8th phase)
Nigeria, Gombe, Local Government Councils and Chairmen
20 December: Thailand, 
21 December: Libya, Municipal Councils
22 December: India
Arunachal Pradesh, Municipal Corporation, Municipal Councils, District Councils and Village Councils
Karnataka, Village Councils (1st phase)
27 December: India, Karnataka, Village Councils (2nd phase)
28 December: Bangladesh, Mayors and Municipal Councils (1st phase)

References

local
local
Political timelines of the 2020s by year
local